Abba Hillel Silver (January 28, 1893 – November 28, 1963) was an American Rabbi and Zionist leader. He was a key figure in the mobilization of American support for the founding of the State of Israel, though he saw such a settlement as a means to protect Jewish heritage rather than having it serve as a main point of purpose for Jews.

Biography
Born Abraham Silver in Naumiestis, in the Suwałki Governorate of Congress Poland, a part of the Russian Empire (present-day Lithuania), son and grandson of Orthodox rabbis, he was brought to the US at the age of nine. A Zionist from his youth, he made his first speech at a Zionist meeting at age fourteen. Educated in the public schools and after-school Jewish schools of New York City's Lower East Side, he left after high school to attend the Hebrew Union College (HUC) and the University of Cincinnati. After graduation as valedictorian of his HUC class and ordination in 1915—and now known as Abba Hillel Silver—he served as rabbi of a small congregation, Leshem Shomayim, now Temple Shalom (Wheeling, West Virginia). In 1917, at age twenty-four, he became rabbi of The Temple - Tifereth Israel in Cleveland, Ohio, one of the nation's largest and best-known Reform congregations, where he served for forty-six years.

Abba Hillel Silver was an early champion of rights for labor, for worker's compensation and civil liberties, though his highest priorities were to advance respect for and support of Zionism. He canvassed first Reform Jewish congregations, then American Jewry, then the American public and politicians, and last the international community, the United Nations in particular. Silver was a keynote speaker in the Allied Jewish Campaign to raise funds jointly for Zionist projects in Palestine and for European Jewry.

At a meeting of the American Zionist Emergency Council in May 1944, Silver argued that ‘our overemphasizing the refugee issue has enabled our opponents to state that that, if it is rescue you are concerned about, why don’t you concentrate on that and put the politics aside…It is possible for the Diaspora to undermine the Jewish state, because the urgency of the rescue issue could lead the world to accept a temporary solution…We should place increased emphasis on fundamental Zionist ideology’.

Silver was one of the chief Zionist spokesmen appearing before the United Nations in the Palestine hearings of 2 October 1947 in what the Israeli government says was the future nation's acceptance speech, two weeks before Moshe Shertok made the case for Israel on 17 October 1947.  Silver expressed reservations about the UN partition plan. A practical man, Silver did ultimately accept partition of Palestine as the best means to rapidly create a homeland for the Jewish people.

Abba Hillel Silver was a leading proponent of Zionism in America and met with President Truman several times to discuss his views until his uncompromising manner caused friction with the White House, leading to estrangement from the Truman White House, including Truman's appearance on national television to announce the formation of the State of Israel. The story of his pounding on Harry Truman's desk at the White House, however, after much research by Rafael Medoff, has been shown to be untrue.

By mobilizing Jewish and non-Jewish support and through a relationship with the Republican party that resulted in 1948 in a pro-Israel plank in their platform, Silver left Truman no choice but to support Israel and recognize it immediately after it declared its independence.

A nationally-known orator and author of many scholarly works, including important studies of the history of Jewish-Christian relations, Silver also served as head of many Jewish and Zionist organizations.

He died on November 28, 1963, and was interred at Mayfield Cemetery in Cleveland Heights, Ohio.

Works

See also
 Temple Tifereth-Israel, Beachwood, Ohio

References

1893 births
1963 deaths
People from Kudirkos Naumiestis
Lithuanian Jews
Emigrants from the Russian Empire to the United States
American people of Lithuanian-Jewish descent
American Reform rabbis
American Zionists
Hebrew Union College – Jewish Institute of Religion alumni
University of Cincinnati alumni
Burials at Mayfield Cemetery
Activists from New York (state)
Reform Zionists
20th-century American rabbis
Rabbis from Wheeling, West Virginia